Dhani Nivat, the Prince Bidyalabh Bridhyakon (7 November 1885 – 8 September 1974) was a member of the Chakri dynasty and Thai courtier. Previously known as Prince Dhaninivat Sonakul (หม่อมเจ้าธานีนิวัต โสณกุล), he received princely rank in 1922. Prince Dhani served many Thai monarchs as Minister of Education and as President of the Privy Council; in the latter capacity he acted as regent for King Bhumibol Adulyadej on three separate occasions. The prince was also known for his academic writings on Thai history and culture. He served as president of the Siam Society for over 20 years.

Biography

Early life
Prince Dhaninivat Sonakul was born on 7 November 1885, the eldest son of Prince Sonabandhit, the Prince Bidyalabh Pruethidhada and Am Sonakul Na Ayutthaya (née Kuntholchinda). Prince Sonabandhit was the 62nd son of King Mongkut and Consort Vad. His father was the first Siamese military attaché in London. As Prince Dhaninivat was born right after the end of his father's posting abroad his name meant "Returning to the City" (of Bangkok).

The prince was raised in the Inner Court of the Grand Palace, where his grandmother was Mistress of the Robes. In 1898 at the age of 13, Prince Dhaninivat was ordained as a Samanera or novice monk in the Buddhist Sangha, as was customary for all Thai males. However, as a royal prince his ordination service was carried out at the chapel royal (Wat Phra Kaew). In 1909 he became a full fledge Bhikkhu monk under Vajirananavarorasa and resided with him at Wat Bowonniwet.

His father insisted he continued his studies abroad. After leaving the monkhood he went to England and under King Chulalongkorn's sponsorship studied at Rugby School. He then went on to study Oriental Languages at Merton College, Oxford (namely Pali and Sanskrit) and graduated with second-class honours.

Government service
The prince returned to Siam and began working at the Ministry of the Interior under Prince Damrong Rajanubhab. He was sent up country and became chief of the administrative bureau of the Circle of Ayutthaya. During the reign of King Vajiravudh he was appointed Private Secretary to Queen Saovabha Phongsri, the mother of the king. After the queen mother's death in 1919, he became the king's secretary of foreign correspondence, as well as clerk of the Cabinet Council and Secretary of the Privy Council. In 1922 he was elevated to the higher princely rank of Phra Ong Chao; thus becoming Phra Worawongse Ther Phra Ong Chao Dhani Nivat (พระวรวงศ์เธอ พระองค์เจ้าธานีนิวัต).

In the reign of King Prajadhipok he was appointed acting-Minister of Education after the resignation of Chaophraya Thammasakmontri, afterwards he took over the ministry as its principal minister on 3 August 1926. After the Siamese revolution of 1932, the prince and all members of the extended royal family was removed from the government by the Khana Ratsadon (the People's party). Chaophraya Thammasakmontri took over the Ministry of Education once more under the constitutional government. Prince Dhani then retired from government service.

Courtier
On 25 March 1950 he became a privy councillor to King Bhumibol Adulyadej. When the king decided to return to Switzerland for further education, he appointed Prince Rangsit Prayurasakdi, the Prince of Chainat the Regent of Thailand, and asked Prince Dhani Nivat to become President of the Privy Council of Thailand in his stead, he was appointed on 4 June 1950. On 8 May 1950, the king in commemoration of his own coronation ceremony, in which Prince Dhani played a major part, granted to the prince a further honour of "Krom" rank retitling him: Phra Worawongse Ther Krom Muen Bidyalabh Bridhyakon (พระวรวงศ์เธอ กรมหมื่นพิทยลาภพฤฒิยากร). On 7 March 1951 Prince Rangsit died. The king again asked Prince Dhani Nivat to succeed him, this time as the regent. He was appointed on 12 March 1951. After the king's permanent return to Thailand in 1952, the prince continued to serve as president of the Privy Council.

The prince served as regent twice more, both in 1963. Firstly from 27 May to 6 June, when the king made a state visit to Japan and the Republic of China. And from 9 to 14 July during his visit to the Philippines.

Prince Dhani Nivat died on 8 September 1974 at the age of 88. He was married to Prayoon Sonakul na Ayutthaya (née Sukhum), daughter of Phraya Yommarat (Pun Sukhum). They have three children.

Selected works
 1954 : "The Date and Authorship of the Romance of Phra Lo" in Journal of the Siam Society vol. 41 no. 2
 1955 : "The Reconstruction of Rama I of the Chakri Dynasty" in Journal of the Siam Society vol. 43 no. 1
 1958 : "The Age of King Rama I of the Chakri Dynasty" in Journal of the Siam Society vol. 46 no. 1
 Unknown date : "The Old Siamese Conception Of Monarchy in Journal of the Siam Society
 Unknown date : "King Mongkut Autograph Letter To Pius IX in Journal of the Siam Society

Titles and honours

Titles
1885: His Serene Highness Prince Dhaninivat Sonakul
1922: His Highness Prince Dhani Nivat
1950: His Highness Prince Dhani Nivat, Prince Bidyalabh Bridhyakon

Honours
  Knight of the Order of the Royal House of Chakri
  Knight of the Ratana Varabhorn Order of Merit
  Knight Grand Cross (First Class) of the Order of Chula Chom Klao
  Knight Grand Cordon (Special Class) of the Order of the White Elephant
  Knight Grand Cordon (Special Class) of the Order of the Crown of Thailand
  Member of the Vallabhabhorn Order
  Dushdi Mala Medal for Distinguished Services in Arts and Sciences
  King Rama IX Royal Cypher Medal 1st Class

Foreign honours
  Grand Commander (Honorary) Order of the Defender of the Realm (Malaysia) (1964)

See also
Siam Society
Privy Council of Thailand
Regent of Thailand
Monarchy of Thailand

References
Citations

Bibliography
 "Dhani Nivas Bidyalabh Bridhyakorn, H.R.H. Prince" in Gerald W. Fry, Gayla S. Nieminen, Harold E. Smith, Historical Dictionary of Thailand, 3a ed. (Scarecrow Press, 2013) p. 136 

1885 births
1974 deaths
Thai male Phra Ong Chao
Regents of Thailand
Sonakul family
Knights of the Ratana Varabhorn Order of Merit
Knights Grand Cordon of the Order of Chula Chom Klao
Members of the Vallabhabhorn Order
Recipients of the Dushdi Mala Medal, Pin of Arts and Science
People educated at Rugby School
Alumni of Merton College, Oxford
Thai male Mom Chao
Ministers of Education of Thailand
Members of the Privy Council of Thailand
19th-century Chakri dynasty
20th-century Chakri dynasty